Donald Treiman (born 1940) is an American sociologist, currently the Distinguished Professor Emeritus at University of California, Los Angeles and an Elected Fellow of the American Association for the Advancement of Science.

References

External links

1940 births
Living people
University of California, Los Angeles faculty
American sociologists